The SS was an option package for a range of Holden vehicles, featuring V8 engines, unique interiors, body kits, louder and higher flowing exhaust systems, that generally express a more aggressive and performance-centered feel over non-SS models. The SS badge is an acronym for "Super Sport", and was initially used in 1961 by General Motors, Holden's parent company.

The VE & VF Commodore SS V models are somewhat closely related in design philosophy to the Cadillac V series, As shown by the badge.

HQ SS 

Introduced in mid 1972 as a Limited-Run Option package for the Holden Belmont V8 sedan, enhanced into a budget sports car to compete with Ford Australia's Falcon GT, with a 5.0L Holden V8 optional, Paired with a standard 4-Speed Manual, Backed by a 10-Bolt Salisbury differential with a 3.36:1 ratio (Unusually, painted white, along with the driveshaft)

The interior featured a Sports dash, including a tachometer and dual split gauges for fuel, oil pressure, temperature and voltage, other features include a sporty steering wheel, center console and bucket seats trimmed in black vinyl with houndstooth inserts

The exterior featured a stripe and decal kit supplied by 3M Australia, other exterior features include General Motors of Canada imported Pontiac rally wheels. The SS was available in 3 colours: Lettuce Alone (light green), Infra Red (reddish orange) and Ultraviolet (Purpleish Gunmetal Grey Metallic).

LX Torana SS Hatch 

The LX Torana SS Hatchback was a performance centered version of the LX Hatch, Powered by either a 202 cubic-inch Holden Straight-Six, or two sizes of Holden V8, in 253 (4.2) or 308 (5.0L) capacities, bolted to either a Four-Speed Borg-Warner Manual, or a Three-Speed Holden Tri-Matic Automatic, Backed by a 10-Bolt Salisbury Differential with Heavy-Duty Axles, Most remaining SS Toranas have ended up in the hands of Street-Machiners and tastefully modified.

An A9X recently sold at auction for $500,000. In mid 2021 one was expected to fetch over $1,000,000 at auction

Commodore SS models 

Since the '80s, right up until Holden's Australian production ceased in late 2017, the 'SS' name had been used on V8-powered (with the exception of one Supercharged Ecotec V6), bodykit-fitted Commodores, renowned Australia-wide for its ability to comfortably transport a family of up to 5 from one end of the country to the other, while being able to smoke its competitors (No surprise, given its US-Sourced Small Block V8) whenever its driver saw fit, SS-Spec Commodores normally featured Easily identifiable 'SS' Badging on the bootlid (And rear doors in VY onwards Models (Forward of rear wheel arches on Utes)), The SS sat above the V6-powered S and later SV6 models

Commodore SS V
The Commodore SS V was a more refined version of the Commodore SS produced between 2006 and 2017 across VE and VF generations. Featuring more track ready,sporty or luxury features, bridging the gap between the SS and Calais V, such as Leather seats, electronically adjustable seats, thicker steering wheel, alloy rims and more. The SS V, along with its badge are inspired by Cadillac's V series vehicles.

Engines

See also
Holden HQ
Holden Belmont
Holden Commodore
Holden Torana

notes
1. With the exceltion of the 202-powered Torana SS, and the L67 Supercharged V6 available in third generation Commodores.
2. The Commodore VF II featured a Bi-Modal exhaust.
3. In high-intensity racing scenarios, HDT would occasionally use Ford C-series gearboxes.
4. In the VT Series II onwards. Previously a 5L Holden V8 was used in the VN through VT Series I models.

References 

 Holden vehicles
General Motors vehicles